Thick as Thieves may refer to:

Film 
 Thick as Thieves (1998 film), a film directed by Scott Sanders
 Thick as Thieves (2009 film), a film directed by Mimi Leder starring Morgan Freeman

Literature 
 Thick as Thieves (Spiegelman novel), a 2011 novel by Peter Spiegelman
 Thick as Thieves (Turner novel), a 2017 novel by Megan Whalen Turner
 Thick as Thieves, a 1989 Hardy Boys Casefiles novel
 Thick as Thieves, a 1985 novel by Marie Ferrarella

Music

Albums 
 Thick as Thieves (Cavo album) or the title song (see below), 2012
 Thick as Thieves (The Temper Trap album) or the title song, 2016
 Thick as Thieves (Trooper album), 1978
 Thick as Thieves, by Kicked in the Head, 2000

Songs 
 "Thick as Thieves" (Cavo song), 2011
 "Thick as Thieves", by Bon Jovi from What About Now, 2013
 "Thick as Thieves", by Dashboard Confessional from The Shade of Poison Trees, 2007
 "Thick as Thieves", by the Jam from Setting Sons, 1979
 "Thick as Thieves", by Kasabian from West Ryder Pauper Lunatic Asylum, 2009
 "Thick as Thieves", by Natalie Merchant from Ophelia, 1998
 "Thick as Thieves", by the Others from Inward Parts, 2006
 "Thick as Thieves", by Peter Wolf from Come as You Are, 1987
 "Thick as Thieves", by Shinedown from Threat to Survival, 2015
 "Thick as Thieves", by Short Stack from Shimmy a Go Go, 2008
 "Thick as Thieves", by the Summer Set from Everything's Fine, 2011

Television 
 Thick as Thieves (TV series), a 1974 British sitcom

Episodes 
 "Thick as Thieves" (Benson)
 "Thick as Thieves" (Cold Case)
 "Thick as Thieves" (Highlander: The Raven)
 "Thick as Thieves", an episode of All About Me
 "Thick as Thieves", an episode of Born and Bred

See also 
 "(You & Me) As Thick as Thieves", a song by Bang! Bang! Eche!